Monochroa inflexella is a moth of the family Gelechiidae. It is found in Sweden, Lithuania, the Czech Republic, Slovakia, Austria, Romania and Russia (the southern Ural).

The wingspan is 9–14 mm. Adults are on wing from June to July.

References

Moths described in 1992
Monochroa
Moths of Europe